Elizabeth Topham Kennan (born February 25, 1938) is an American academic who served as the 16th president of Mount Holyoke College from 1978 to 1995.  She also served as president of the Five Colleges consortium from 1985 to 1994.

Education
Kennan was born in Philadelphia, Pennsylvania. Kennan received her Bachelor of Arts summa cum laude in history from Mount Holyoke in 1960. She pursued a second bacheor's degree on a Marshall Scholarship (subsequently Master of Arts) at St. Hilda's College, Oxford University, which she completed in 1962.  She received her Doctor of Philosophy from the University of Washington in 1966.

Career
Kennan was professor of medieval history at Catholic University from 1966 – 1978 before joining Mount Holyoke as president 1978 – 1995. As president of Mount Holyoke, she was a proponent of single-sex education, stating to the Los Angeles Times in 1994: "Single-sex education for girls is a proven method for ensuring that they reach their fullest potential. I will be the first to call for coeducation at Mount Holyoke, the country's oldest women's college, when our society grants young women equal status in coeducational settings". Kennan was also president of the Five Colleges consortium for nine years (1985–1994) while at Mount Holyoke. Upon her retirement from Mount Holyoke in 1995, the Kennan Faculty Chair and Lectureship was established.

She has also served as a trustee of the University of Notre Dame, along with the National Trust for Historic Preservation and the National Trust Community Investment Corporation, and on the oversight committee of the Folger Shakespeare Library. Among the corporate boards on which Kennan has served as director or trustee are Bell Atlantic, Shawmut Bank, and Putnam Investments.

Mystery author
In 2000, Kennan co-authored the mystery novel, Overnight Float, with Jill Ker Conway (former president of Smith College).  The novel is published under the pen name "Clare Munnings" and was their first venture into the mystery genre.

Personal life
Kennan has been married since 1986 to Michael Burns,  the former actor (Wagon Train and It's a Man's World) and professor emeritus at Mount Holyoke. While at Mount Holyoke, the couple resided in Ipswich in Essex County, Massachusetts, and in the village of South Woodstock in Windsor County in eastern Vermont. Since 2002, they have resided in Boyle County near Danville, Kentucky, where they have restored the Cambus-Kenneth Estate, a Thoroughbred horse, cattle, and crop farm listed on the National Register of Historic Places.

A Democrat like her husband, Kennan in 2006 contributed to the liberal interest group EMILY's List and to the successful re-election campaign of Democrat John Yarmuth of Louisville for Kentucky's 3rd congressional district seat.

See also
List of historians

References

External links
Biography
 Retirement  press release 1
Retirement press  release 2
 Press release on her official presidential portrait, 1996

1938 births
Living people
21st-century American historians
American women novelists
Catholic University of America School of Arts and Sciences faculty
Mount Holyoke College alumni
Mount Holyoke College faculty
Presidents and Principals of Mount Holyoke College
People from South Hadley, Massachusetts
People from Ipswich, Massachusetts
People from Windsor County, Vermont
Writers from Danville, Kentucky
University of Washington alumni
Writers from Philadelphia
20th-century American novelists
American women historians
20th-century American women writers
Massachusetts Democrats
Vermont Democrats
Kentucky Democrats
Novelists from Pennsylvania
Novelists from Massachusetts
Novelists from Kentucky
20th-century American essayists
Historians from Pennsylvania
Historians from Massachusetts
21st-century American women writers
Women heads of universities and colleges